America Progressive Telugu Association (also referred to as APTA) is a non-profit organization primarily aimed at networking for  Telugu people in United States of America. It is incorporated in Wichita, Kansas. APTA  was founded in January 2008.

The association
This United States-based non profit Telugu association not only connects Telugu people of Indian origin but also provides scholarships to underprivileged merit students each year.

References

External links 
 APTA website
 Gidestar Profile

Telugu society
Telugu organizations in North America
Telugu American
Non-profit organizations based in the United States